Raphaela Keiser (born 13 July 1997) is a Swiss curler.

Teams

Women's

Mixed

Personal life

Grand Slam record

References

External links

Video: 

Living people
1997 births
Swiss female curlers
Place of birth missing (living people)
21st-century Swiss women